= Virus mutation =

Virus mutation is mutation of viruses and may refer to:

- The feature of viruses to cause mutation in the human genome
- The feature of viruses to perform viral genetic change in their own genome.
